The Church of Jesus Christ of Latter-day Saints in Paraguay refers to the Church of Jesus Christ of Latter-day Saints (LDS Church) and its members in Paraguay. The first branch was established in 1948. Since then, the LDS Church in Paraguay has grown to more than 98,000 members in 134 congregations.

History

Pre-Paraguayan Missions 
The LDS Church was organized in 1830 and is a missionary church. Its first missionary took place a month after their initial organization. The first example of a foreign LDS Church in 1837 was in Great Britain, missions were sent across the world by 1854. The Pacific Isles in 1844, France in 1849, Asia and Australia in 1851, and South Africa in 1853.

Though the Mormon faith was always intended to be spread to the whole world, it was not preached in South America until 1925, though there had been an earlier, unsuccessful mission in 1851. Due to language barriers and insufficient funds the 1851 missionaries returned home. Between 1851 and 1925 no other attempts to preach were made.

Paraguayan Missions 
The first LDS Church member to visit Paraguay was Frederick S. Williams, in 1939 who was working as a missionary in Argentina. The first member was baptized in August 1948 and the first official congregation was organised that same year. The LDS Church has grown significantly since then; when the church first appeared in Paraguay there were 5 members, this number has since grown to over 97,000 or roughly 1.4% of the population. 

In 2020, the LDS Church temporarily canceled services and other public gatherings in response to the spread of the coronavirus pandemic which resumed online and/or in person, depending on the congregation.

Missions

Temples

Asunción Paraguay Temple

See also
 Religion in Paraguay

References

External links
 Newsroom - Paraguay (Spanish)
 The Church of Jesus Christ of Latter-day Saints (Paraguay) - Official site (Spanish)
 The Church of Jesus Christ of Latter-day Saints - Official site (Guaraní}
 ComeUntoChrist.org Latter-day Saints Visitor site
 Official Asunción Paraguay Temple page
 Asunción Paraguay Temple page